Abdel Majid Naji (born 14 October 1936) is a Tunisian former footballer. He competed in the men's tournament at the 1960 Summer Olympics.

References

External links
 
 

1936 births
Living people
Tunisian footballers
Tunisia international footballers
Olympic footballers of Tunisia
Footballers at the 1960 Summer Olympics
Footballers from Tunis
Association football forwards
Espérance Sportive de Tunis players